Moral Instruction is the fourth studio album by Nigerian rapper Falz. It was released on January 15, 2019, by Bahd Guys Entertainment. The album was recorded in Nigerian pidgin and samples musical recordings from Fela Kuti. Its production was primarily handled by Sess, with additional production from TMXO, Willis, and Chillz. The album features collaborations with Demmie Vee, Chillz and Sess. Moral Instruction addresses societal issues such as corrupt politicians, corruption, police brutality, prostitution, social injustice and internet fraud. The album's release was preceded by "Talk", a socio-conscious record that addresses critical events. The cover art for Moral Instruction was created by Nigerian artist Lemi Ghariokwu, a long-time Fela collaborator. The album won Best Rap Album and Album of the Year at The Headies 2019.

Background 
Falz recorded Moral Instruction in 2018. He described it as a movement, re-education and re-orientation. The album is considered an extension of the rapper's 2018 single "This Is Nigeria", a political and socio-cultural track that captured the attention of many with its blunt messages. The album's listening party was held at the Landmark Towers in Victoria Island, Lagos.  Guests who attended the listening party were dressed in their school uniforms and were gifted stationery materials.

Composition 
Moral Instruction opens with "Johnny", a song that tackles Nigeria's insecurity and reckless killings; Falz depicts a vivid story of a NYSC member who was shot in Abuja by a police officer in July 2018. "Follow Follow" is a blend of Afrobeat and hip hop. Interspersed with Fela's "Zombie", the song is about one finding their identity amidst the distraction of social media and celebrity craze. "Hypocrites" addresses the pretentious lifestyle of Nigerians, specifically religious leaders. In "Talk", Falz addresses critical events and advises Nigerian youth to be careful about greedy politicians. "Amen" is a critical appraisal of religion and the double standards that we often see. In "Brother's Keeper", Falz explains the need for personal responsibility and how the problems of Nigeria are interconnected. "Paper" launches a staunch attack on the culture of ritualism, internet fraud and child marriage. In "E No Finish", Falz speaks against the greed of politicians and the causal link it has with the vices. On the closing track "After All Said And Done", he admits to his own imperfections.

Singles and other releases 
The album's lead single "Talk" was released on January 12, 2019. It sheds light on greedy politicians, ineffective presidency, and Nigeria's penchant for consumption. Falz opens the record talking about the Muslim Rights Concern's failure to appear in court several months after serving him a 7-day ultimatum to withdraw the video for "This Is Nigeria". He also spoke about the misappropriation of public funds by political leaders, and sheds light on pastors who purchase private jet while their congregation live in extreme poverty. The music video for "Talk" was released on January 10, 2019. It begins with a young boy playing a video game with Falz as his character. The game allows the boy to use the character he selected to either "Save Nigeria," "Relocate to Yankee" or "Join Gang". He chooses the first option, sending Falz into the real world where the rapper tries to become a politician and judge.

On January 20, 2019, Falz released "The Curriculum", an eight-minute short film that highlights all the songs on the album. The film stars Falz, Yung Willis, Kunle Oshodi-Glover Jr, and Bolly Lomo; it also features cameo appearances from Olumide Oworu, Nancy Isime, Nkem Marchie, and Jemima Osunde. The introductory scenes show students treating each other badly, alluding to the fact that Nigerians don't care enough about one another. Subsequent scenes show armed students meeting at night and performing some sort of ritual. Another scene depicts a morning assembly in which students are assembled to elect members of their student body and there are only two candidates; this particular scene is an attempt to portray the Nigerian political scene in which the ruling parties present candidates and the others are considered non-existent.

On April 9, 2019, Falz released the Iyobosa Rehoboth-directed visuals for "Hypocrite". In it, he portrays an election official whose polling unit is attacked by political thugs prior to announcing the start of voting.

Critical reception

Moral Instruction received positive reviews from music critics. Ehis Ohunyon of Pulse Nigeria called it a "compact album that holds important conversations" and said while the remaining tracks on it are good, they failed to keep the spark and edge of the project's opening three tracks  Music journalist Oris Aigbokhaevbolo said Moral Instruction lacks introspection, but "does a much better job of political commentary than This Is Nigeria". Aigbokhaevbolo also opined that the album might be Falz's "best chance to outlive his corporeal self".

In a review for Nigerian Entertainment Today, Umar Sa'ad Hassan praised Falz's narrative skills and cognizant efforts to deliver positive messages, but ended the review saying he tries too hard to exert himself on some Fela sounds. Faithfulness Okom of Medium described Moral Instruction as a "conscious magnus [sic] opus by all standards" and declared it a "game changing and culture redefining project that is lyrically consistent". A writer for Jaguda praised Falz for blending Afrobeat and hip hop seamlessly and said the "message on the album was delivered without ambiguity".

Accolades

Track listing 

Track notes

 "Talk" contains backing vocals by Chillz and Willis.
 "Brother's Keeper" contains backing vocals by Bamike "Bam Bam" Olawunmi, Chillz, Sess and Deena Ade.
 "E No Finish" contains backing vocals by Sess, Seun Olufemi-White and Simisola Giwa-Osagie
 "E No Finish" and "After All Said And Done" both contain additional instrumentation; Tee-Mothi created the horns and Alabama Georgia created the percussion.

Sample credits

 "Johnny" contains a sample from "J.J.D. (Johnny Just Drop)", as performed by Fela Kuti.
 "Follow Follow" contains a sample from "Zombie", as performed by Fela Kuti.
 "Amen" features an element from "Coffin for Head of State", as performed by Fela Kuti.
 "E No Finish" contains an interpolation of "Army Arrangement", as performed by Fela Kuti.

Personnel
Credits were adapted from an instagram note posted by the rapper.

Folarin Falana – primary artist
Demmie Vee – featured artist
Sess – featured artist, production 
Chillz – featured artist, production 
TMXO – production 
Willis – production 
Tee-Mothi – horns 
Alabama Georgia – percussion

Release history

References

External links
Official website for the Moral Instruction album

2019 albums
Albums produced by Sess
Falz albums
Yoruba-language albums